Sir Andrew Rae Duncan, GBE (3 June 1884 – 30 March 1952) was a British businessman who was brought into government during World War II, serving twice as both President of the Board of Trade and Minister of Supply.

Duncan was a Director of the Bank of England and of Imperial Chemical Industries. He was chairman of the Central Electricity Board from 1927 to 1935, and chairman of the British Iron and Steel Federation from 1935 until 1945. He was elected as a "National" Member of Parliament (MP) for the City of London in a 1940 by-election and was made a member of the Cabinet and a Privy Counsellor. He was re-elected at the 1945 election, stepped down at the 1950 general election.

During his time in ministerial office, there was some concern that someone so closely involved with the iron, steel and chemical industries was in charge of their regulation. However, wartime pressures kept Duncan in post and he was undamaged. He returned to the Iron and Steel Federation after the war, working to resist the Labour government's nationalisation plans with Aubrey Jones, his assistant, later a Conservative minister.

He was knighted in 1921 and appointed a Knight Grand Cross of the Order of the British Empire (GBE) in 1938. He was also awarded the Italian Order of Saints Maurice and Lazarus.

In addition to his service in the United Kingdom, Duncan was appointed in 1926 by Canadian Prime Minister William Lyon Mackenzie King in response to the Maritime Rights Movement to chair the Royal Commission on Maritime Claims, which was thus nicknamed the "Duncan Commission".

In 1916, he married Anne Jordan. They had two sons, one of whom was killed in action in 1940. He died in his sleep on 30 March 1952, aged 67.

References

External links 
 
 

1884 births
1952 deaths
British Secretaries of State
High Sheriffs of the County of London
Imperial Chemical Industries people
Knights Bachelor
Knights Grand Cross of the Order of the British Empire
Members of Parliament of the United Kingdom for the City of London
Members of the Parliament of the United Kingdom for English constituencies
Members of the Privy Council of the United Kingdom
Ministers in the Chamberlain wartime government, 1939–1940
Ministers in the Churchill caretaker government, 1945
Ministers in the Churchill wartime government, 1940–1945
Ministers of Supply
National Liberal Party (UK, 1931) politicians
People associated with the Bank of England
People from Irvine, North Ayrshire
Presidents of the Board of Trade
UK MPs 1935–1945
UK MPs 1945–1950
20th-century English businesspeople